Diplocardia is a genus of North American (USA, Mexico) earthworms with 52-57 known species that is remarkably similar to Australian Diplotrema Spencer, 1900.

Species include Diplocardia pettiboneae (Gates 1977) and Diplocardia longa (Moore 1904), with bioluminescent mucus.

The second largest earthworm in North America is Diplocardia meansi (Gates 1977) and is endemic to Rich Mountain in the Ouachita Mountains.

References 

 Blakemore, R.J. (2005). American earthworms from north of the Rio Grande - a species checklist.  COE, YNU. Retrieved on 10 May 2005 
 Blakemore, R.J. (2006). American earthworms from north of the Rio Grande - a species checklist (2nd edition).  COE, YNU. Retrieved on 13th Dec, 2006 
 James, S.W. (1995). Systematics, biogeography and ecology of earthworms from eastern, central, southern and southwestern USA. in P. Hendrix (ed.) Earthworm Ecology and Biogeography in North America, pp. 29–51. CRC Press, Inc, Boca Raton, Florida. Retrieved on 4th Mar, 2008 from  Google Books

Haplotaxida